Ectoedemia nyssaefoliella is a moth of the family Nepticulidae. It is found in Kentucky, Ohio and North Carolina in the United States.

The wingspan is 4.5–6 mm. There are two or three generations per year. The larvae of the first generation become full-grown in June.

The larvae feed on Nyssa sylvatica. They mine the leaves of their host plant. The mine is narrow and linear at first, then abruptly enlarging into a blotch. The cocoon is pale greenish brown.

External links
Nepticulidae of North America

Nepticulidae
Moths of North America
Moths described in 1880